This is a list of defunct airlines of the Czech Republic.

See also
 List of airlines of Czech Republic
 List of airports in Czech Republic

References

Czech Republic
Airlines
Airlines, defunct